Jeraldino is a surname. Notable people with the surname include:

Ignacio Jeraldino (born 1995), Chilean footballer
Juan Jeraldino (born 1995), Chilean footballer